Cyril Posthumus (28 August 1918 – 9 October 1992) was a British writer on the history of motor cars.

Career
Posthumus was Associate Editor of Autosport from 1950 and Motoring News from 1957, whence he served as editor until 1959, and again from 1961. From 1963 he was features editor on The Motor until 1966. After two years with Motor Racing he remained a freelance for the rest of his career, whilst also editing the Brooklands Society Gazette.

Works
His works include: 
The 16 Cylinder G.P. Auto Union, 1967 Profile Publications
The 1926–1927 1½ Litre Delage, 1966 Profile Publications
4½ litre Lago-Talbot, 1972 Profile Publications
The British Competition Car, 1959  Batsford Academic
Classic Racing Cars, 
Classic Sports Cars, with David Hodge 
Land Speed Record: A Complete History of the Record-Breaking Cars from 39 to 600+ m.p.h.,  
The German Grand Prix, 1966 Temple Press
Mercedes and Mercedes Benz Racing Car Guide 1901-1955, 
Motor Cars (Transport & Society), 
The 1906-1908 Renault Grand Prix, 1967 (Profile Publications Number 79)
The Racing Car Development and Design, with Cecil Clutton and Denis Jenkinson, 1956 BT Batsford Ltd, London
The Roaring Twenties: An album of early motor racing, 
Sir Henry Segrave, a biography of the British racing car driver, 1961 BT Batsford Ltd, London
The Story of Veteran & Vintage Cars, 
Vintage Cars, concerning cars made in the 1920s,  
World Sportscar Championship, 1961 MacGibbon and Kee
 numerous articles in Road & Track, Car and Driver, etc.

References

British motoring journalists
Historians of motorsport
1918 births
1992 deaths